Henry Stevens may refer to:

Henry Stevens (bibliographer) (1819–1886), American bibliographer
Henry Herbert Stevens (1878–1973), Canadian politician and businessman
Henry Stevens (GC) (born 1928), British policeman awarded the George Cross
Henry Isaac Stevens (1806–1873), British architect
Henry Stevens (Australian politician) (1854–1935), member of the Queensland Legislative Assembly
Henry Stevens (Wisconsin politician) (1818–1875), Wisconsin state senator

See also
Harry M. Stevens (1856–1934), food concessionaire variously attributed as the inventor of the hot dog
Henry Stephens (disambiguation)
Henry Marshall Steven (1893-1969) Scottish forester